Calling Albany is the second and final studio album by Vermont. It was released on January 22, 2002, on Kindercore Records.

Track listing
All tracks by Dan Didier, Chris Rosenau and Davey vonBohlen

"Bells of Saint Alcohol" – 2:46
"Chlorine Chlorine" – 2:53
"Ballad of Larry Bird" – 3:58
"*" – 5:41
"Where the Wild Drums Are" – 2:52
"Hello_Goodbye Sex" – 3:23
"Screw-on Shoes" – 3:21
"Kill an Hour" – 2:48
"Arrest Harrison Ford!" – 2:40
"The World Doesn't Ask You" – 3:39
"Commodores 64" – 1:30
"I'd Be Happy as the World Turning Around You" – 3:14

Personnel 
 Dan Didier – Drums, Engineer
 Justin Engel – Mastering
 Scott Kawczynski – Art Direction
 Chris Rosenau – Engineer
 Damian Strigens – Bass
 Davey vonBohlen – Guitar, Vocals, Engineer

References

2002 albums
Vermont (band) albums
Kindercore Records albums